Conscientious objection to abortion is the right of medical staff to refuse participation in abortion for personal belief.

By country

Americas

United States

Europe

Conscientious objection is granted in 22 member states of the European Union plus the United Kingdom, Norway and Switzerland. It is not granted in Sweden, Finland, Bulgaria, Iceland, or Turkey. The right of member states to enact legislation that limit the right to conscientious objection to abortion was upheld by the European Court of Human Rights in March 2020.

Croatia

Doctors and other medical personnel have the right to conscientious objection. Rada Borić (Women's Network Croatia) has argued that it is given more prominence than the women's right to abortion, thus making it difficult. On February 21, 2017, the Constitutional Court ordered the Parliament to enact new abortion law within two years, introducing educational and preventive measures to make abortion an exception and not a rule, and to regulate conscientious objection.

Czech Republic

In the Czech Republic since 2011, doctors and medical personnel can choose not to perform an abortion or prescribe any contraceptive (called Výhrada svědomí). But if a doctor refuse to perform an abortion they have to refer the patient to another doctor who can perform it.

Hungary

In 2013, the Committee on the Elimination of Discrimination against Women of the United Nations expressed concern about "the increasing resort to conscientious objection by health professionals in the absence of an adequate regulatory framework."

Ireland

Under section 22 of the Health (Regulation of Termination of Pregnancy) Act 2018, medical practitioners, nurses and midwives have the right not to participate in abortions, except when there is a risk to life or health of the pregnant woman in emergency. They also have to make arrangements to enable the woman to get an abortion.

Italy

The law gives the option for health professionals to claim the right to refuse to perform abortion. If the health personnel demands to be conscientious objector, they have to declare it in advance (Art.9). However, conscientious objection may not be invoked by health professionals if the personal intervention is essential in order to save the life of a woman in imminent danger.

Italy keeps a record of the objecting doctors. According to data from the Ministry of Health, between 1997 and 2016 there was a 12.9% increase in the number of gynecologists who refuse to perform abortions on moral grounds, from 62.8% to 70.9%, the highest percentage ever recorded. As of 2016 the percentage is higher than the national average in Southern Italy (83.5%) and Sicily and Sardinia (77.7%), and lower in Central (70.1%) and Northern Italy (63.9%). The percentage is growing in all the macroregions except the North. As a result, voluntary abortion is performed only in 60% of the hospitals of the country. Also, non-objecting doctors suffers discrimination, and -in some provinces- needs to perform record-numbers of abortions, up to 15.8 per week in the province of Taranto (Apulia) or 12.2 in the province of Catania (Sicily).

A resolution by the Council of Europe has found several violations of the European Social Charter in the situation:
 right to protection of health (art. 11) of women seeking abortion;
 right to work (art. 1) and to dignity at work (art. 26) of non-objecting medical practitioners, because of different treatment and moral harassment.

Poland

The Constitutional Tribunal "abolished a requirement that medical professionals who refuse to provide health services refer patients to an alternate medical provider".

Portugal

Abortion was legalised in Portugal in 2007. The law allows conscientious objection and many doctors refuse to perform abortion, making it difficult for women to access it.

United Kingdom

In England and Wales and Scotland, medical staff has the right to refuse to participate in abortion because of conscientious objection. Section 4 of the Abortion Act 1967 (which does not extend in Northern Ireland, where abortion is prohibited under most circumstances) states:

Oceania

New Zealand

In New Zealand, Conscientious Object in Abortion is supported by legislation and employment was protected against discrimination, however, in 2020, this protection was partially removed where it causes unreasonable disruption to an employers services.

See also

 Conscientious objector

References

External links
 
 

Abortion law
Abortion by country
Conscientious objection